Max von Essen (born January 11, 1974) is an American stage and screen actor, and vocalist.

Life and career
Raised on Long Island, von Essen is a graduate of South Side High School in Rockville Centre, New York. He attended the University of North Carolina at Chapel Hill, and after graduation toured with Liza Minnelli. He is a member of the Von Essen family, who are part of the German and Swedish nobility. A son of Rita and Thomas Von Essen, who was the New York City Fire Commissioner during the 9/11 terrorist attacks on the World Trade Center, he is the youngest of four children. He is openly gay.

He toured Europe in West Side Story and was a cast member of the U.S. national tour of Chicago. He made his Broadway debut in Jesus Christ Superstar in 2000 as Disciple and Jesus of Nazareth understudy. He appeared in Les Misérables on Broadway as the replacement for Fauchelevent and other roles, and starred in Dance of the Vampires alongside Michael Crawford in 2002. He played the role of student revolutionary leader Enjolras (replacement) in the Les Misérables Broadway revival in 2006 at the Broadhurst Theater.

In 2006, he was a soloist at the biggest Andrew Lloyd Webber musical gala to date, held in Tallinn, Estonia. He performed in the national tour of Xanadu as "Sonny" in 2008 and in the Roundabout Theater Company Off-Broadway production of Maury Yeston's Death Takes a Holiday at the Laura Pels Theatre in 2011. In 2015, von Essen played the role of Parisian aristocrat Henri in the Broadway production of An American in Paris, for which he received a Tony Award for Best Featured Actor in a Musical nomination.

Film and television

Theatre credits

Broadway
Source: Internet Broadway Database

Off-Broadway

Regional

National and international tours

Awards and nominations
Source: IBDB

References

External links
 Official website
 BroadwayWorld: "Max Von Essen – High-Notes in High-Heels"
 BroadwayWorld: interview with Max von Essen, December 7, 2007
 Max von Essen photos 
 Max von Essen on Floormic.com
 
 
 Max von Essen  at Internet off-Broadway Database

Living people
1974 births
20th-century American male actors
21st-century American male actors
American male singers
American male musical theatre actors
American male television actors
American male web series actors
American gay actors
LGBT nobility
German nobility
Male actors from New York (state)
People from Long Island
People from Rockville Centre, New York
South Side High School (Rockville Centre) alumni
Swedish nobility
University of North Carolina at Chapel Hill alumni
Essen family